The Primera División de Fútbol Profesional Apertura 1998 season (officially "Copa Pilsener Apertura 1999") started on August 28, 1998, and finished on December 27, 1998.

The season saw Alianza win its 7th league title after a 1-0 victory over C.D. Luis Ángel Firpo in the final.

Promotion and relegation 
Teams promoted
 C.D. Sonsonate

Teams relegated 
 El Roble

Table
Apertura 1998
Firpo                33 puntos
Alianza             32 puntos
FAS                  29 puntos
Águila              29 puntos

Team information

Personnel and sponsoring

Semifinals 1st Leg

Semifinals 2nd Leg

Final

Top scorers

List of foreign players in the league
This is a list of foreign players in Apertura 1998. The following players:
have played at least one apetura game for the respective club.
have not been capped for the El Salvador national football team on any level, independently from the birthplace

ADET
 

C.D. Águila
  

Alianza F.C.
   Alejandro Curbelo

Arabe Marte
  

 (player released mid season)
  (player Injured mid season)
 Injury replacement player

Dragon
  

C.D. FAS
  Miguel Mariano

C.D. Luis Ángel Firpo
  Celio Rodríguez
  Mauricio Dos Santos
  Raul Toro

Municipal Limeno
  

Santa Clara
  

Sonsonate

External links

Primera División de Fútbol Profesional Apertura seasons
El
1